The Winged Idol is a 1915 American silent drama film directed by Scott Sidney and starring Katharine Kaelred, House Peters and Clara Williams. It was released by Triangle Film on a program alongside Allan Dwan's Jordan Is a Hard Road.

Cast
 Katharine Kaelred as Countess Iva Ivanoff
 House Peters as Jack Leonard 
 Clara Williams as Mildred Leonard 
 Harry Keenan as Mr. Stone 
 Jacob Silbert as Bodyguard 
 Betty Burbridge as Nina Evers 
 J. Frank Burke as Mr. Warner

References

Bibliography
 Frederic Lombardi. Allan Dwan and the Rise and Decline of the Hollywood Studios. McFarland, 2013.

External links
 

1915 films
1915 drama films
1910s English-language films
American silent feature films
Silent American drama films
Films directed by Scott Sidney
American black-and-white films
Triangle Film Corporation films
1910s American films